Mike Straka is an American television and radio host, author and producer. He is a proprietor in the pizza business. He hosted The Straka and Krempel Show on WWBA Big 8 Radio, Sportstalkflorida.com, and previously hosted the MMAVERICKS podcast on BLEAV networks, author of Rowdy Rousey, and the host of the "MMA Noise" YouTube channel. He was co-host and producer on Spike TV's primetime MMA news magazine show, MMA Uncensored Live and he was the creator and the host of "TapouT Radio" on Sirius XM Sports. He serves as the in-cage post fight interview correspondent for World Series of Fighting and as UFC correspondent for Fight Now TV. WSOF 1 aired live on NBC Sports Network on November 3, 2012 from Planet Hollywood in Las Vegas, Nevada. Straka also hosted Fighting Words with Mike Straka on Mark Cuban's HDNet which featured interviews with mixed martial arts athletes. 

Straka is a regular contributor to FIGHT! Magazine, and wrote a book on MMA, based on interviews from his television show, Fighting Words, which was published by Triumph Books. Straka is also a producer at Fuse TV and has interviewed and produced several television pieces on well-known artists, including Sinead O'Connor, Zedd, Sam Smith, Naughty Boy, Wiz Khalifa, R Kelly, Lou Reed, Armin Van Buuren, Jeff Bhasker and more.

Straka was a vice president and executive producer at FOX News Digital, and also served as an on-air commentator on Hollywood and celebrity topics, as well as sports, for the cable net and on FOXNews.com. He created and produced Strategy Room. Straka hosted and was executive producer of FOX Fight Game, a mixed martial arts (MMA) features and news program, and was a columnist on FOXNews.com. Mike has interviewed some of the world's most famous artists in film and television.

Acting career
Mike Straka played a ring side fight commentator in Nick Sasso's Haymaker (2021), and previously played "Young Minetta" in the film Analyze This and appeared as "Johnny" off-Broadway in Tony n' Tina's Wedding. Straka appeared in several television commercials in the 1990s, including The Olive Garden, Healthy Choice Pasta Sauce, The Powerpuff Girls and Target.

Early years
Straka was born in Newark, New Jersey and grew up in Barnegat Township. He graduated from Monsignor Donovan High School (Toms River, New Jersey), where he was on the wrestling team. He studied acting at Rutgers University and wrestled for The Scarlet Knights, and moved to New York City to begin his career, where he specialized in commercials, daytime soaps and the Off-Broadway play Tony N' Tina's Wedding while continuing his studies.

He started his career as a CBS page, ushering audiences through the West 57th Street studios to see talk shows like Geraldo Rivera and Joan Rivers, and giving tours and answering phones throughout the building. After a year as a page, he was hired  by CBS News Radio to be a desk assistant. He joined Fox News Channel just prior to the network launch in 1996, and served as a tape operator, writer, associate producer, producer, and director of operations and special projects for FOXNews.com, and  ended his career there in 2010 as Vice President and Executive Producer for FOX News Digital.
Mike is also a proprietor in the pizza business.

References

External links

New York Times article on Strategy Room
Bloody Elbow Review of Fighting Words
Big Lead Sports Interview
Vigilante MMA interview with Straka
Interview with Mike Straka on MMArecap
Parcbench article on Strategy Room
Huffington Post Interview about Ronda Rousey book

Living people
Fox News people
People from Barnegat Township, New Jersey
American people of Czech descent
Rutgers Scarlet Knights wrestlers
Mixed martial arts broadcasters
Year of birth missing (living people)